The Digital Shorts scheme supported by UK Film Council's New Cinema Fund and  is partnered with organisations in each region and nation of the UK to enable filmmakers to make innovative shorts using digital technology.

Notable short films 

Rhubarb and Roses (2002)
Bouncer (2002)
The End and Back Again (2002)
The Apology line (2007)
Man in a cat (2010)

The nine agencies 
Screen East (East of England)
EM Media (East Midlands)
Film London (Greater London)
Northern Film and Media (North East England)
North West Vision (North West England)
Screen South (South East England)
South West Screen (South West England)
Screen West Midlands (West Midlands)
Screen Yorkshire (Yorkshire and the Humber)

Film organisations in the United Kingdom
Arts organisations based in the United Kingdom
Department for Digital, Culture, Media and Sport